Amar Bensiffedine (born 1938) is a Moroccan footballer. He competed in the men's tournament at the 1964 Summer Olympics.

References

External links
 

1938 births
Living people
Moroccan footballers
Morocco international footballers
Olympic footballers of Morocco
Footballers at the 1964 Summer Olympics
Place of birth missing (living people)
Association football defenders
Botola players
AS FAR (football) players
AS FAR (football) managers
Moroccan football managers